The Embassy of Ghana in Kinshasa is the diplomatic mission of the Republic of Ghana to the Democratic Republic of Congo. It also serves as the official residence of the Ghana ambassador to the Democratic Republic of Congo.

The Ghana ambassador residing in Kinshasa was formerly concurrently accredited to the Republic of the Congo, Chad, Central African Republic, Gabon, Rwanda, Burundi, and Madagascar.

List of Ambassadors

References

Diplomatic missions of Ghana
Diplomatic missions in the Democratic Republic of the Congo